Likabali is one of the 60 assembly constituencies of  Arunachal Pradesh a north east state of India. It is part of Arunachal East Lok Sabha constituency.

Members of Legislative Assembly
 1990: Rima Taipodia, Janata Dal
 1995: Kardu Taipodia, Indian National Congress
 1999: Rima Taipodia, Indian National Congress
 2004: Jomde Kena, Indian National Congress
 2009: Jomde Kena, Independent
 2014: Jomde Kena, Indian National Congress
 2017: Kardo Nyigyor, Bharatiya Janata Party (bypoll)

Election results

2019

2017 by-election

See also

 Likabali
 Lower Siang district
 List of constituencies of Arunachal Pradesh Legislative Assembly

References

Assembly constituencies of Arunachal Pradesh
Lower Siang district